Schwert is a surname. Notable people with the surname include:

Pius Schwert (1892–1941), American politician